Qarah Bolagh or Qareh Bolagh, also rendered as Qarah Bowlagh or Qareh Bowlagh or Qara Bulaq or Kara-Bulag or Qarah Bulagh or Qareh Bulagh, may refer to:

Ardabil Province
Qarah Bolagh, Ardabil

East Azerbaijan Province
Qarah Bolagh, Bostanabad, East Azerbaijan province
Qarah Bolagh, Hashtrud, East Azerbaijan province
Qarah Bolagh, Jolfa, East Azerbaijan province
Qareh Bolagh, Marand, East Azerbaijan province
Qarah Bolagh, Kolah Boz-e Sharqi, Mianeh County, East Azerbaijan province
Qarah Bolagh, Kaghazkonan, Mianeh County, East Azerbaijan province
Qareh Bolagh, alternate name of Quch Ghar, Kaghazkonan District, Mianeh County, East Azerbaijan province
Qarah Bolagh, Sarab, East Azerbaijan province
Qareh Bolagh, Varzaqan, East Azerbaijan province

Fars Province
Qarah Bolagh Rural District (Fasa County), in Fars province

Golestan Province
Qarah Bolagh, Golestan

Hamadan Province
Qarah Bolagh, Asadabad, Hamadan province
Qarah Bolagh, Razan, Hamadan province

Kermanshah Province
Qareh Bolagh-e Azam, Kermanshah province
Qareh Bolagh Sheykh Morad, Kermanshah province

Kurdistan Province
Qarah Bolagh, Baneh, a village in Baneh County
Qarah Bolagh, Bijar, a village in Bijar County
Qarah Bolagh-e Miankuh, a village in Bijar County
Qarah Bolagh-e Khan, a village in Qorveh County
Qarah Bolagh-e Panjeh, a village in Qorveh County

Qazvin Province
Qarah Bolagh, Qazvin

West Azerbaijan Province
Qarah Bolagh, Mahabad, West Azerbaijan province
Qarah Bolagh, Bazargan, Maku County, West Azerbaijan province
Qarah Bolagh, Takab, West Azerbaijan province
Qareh Bolagh-e Olya, West Azerbaijan province
Qareh Bolagh-e Sofla, West Azerbaijan province

Zanjan Province
Qarah Bulagh, Zanjan
Qarah Bolagh, Abhar, Zanjan province
Qarah Bolagh, Ijrud, Zanjan province
Qarah Bolagh Rural District (Soltaniyeh County)